"Framed" is a song by American rapper Eminem. It was first released on December 15, 2017, as a twelfth release track from his ninth solo studio album Revival, and is accompanied by a music video, which was released on April 3, 2018.

Composition
The song, produced by Fredwreck, samples Czechoslovakian progressive rock band, C&K Vocal's 1976 song "Pilgrim".

In the third verse of the song, the word "raping" is censored in the line, "Just escaped from the state pen for raping eight women who hate men."

Music video
A music video for the song was released on April 3, 2018. This followed a trailer for the video released March 28. As of July 25, 2018, the video gets over 27 million views. The video depicts a news reporter (named Stan Dresden, referring to one of Eminem's most popular songs and the street he grew up on) on a TV with breaking news: Eminem gets escaped from an asylum. Then the music starts and Eminem makes the first verse in a forest and a house. Then, the music cuts and the news reporter interviews the detective (named Shelter; referring to a music venue of the same name, of which it was used as a rap battle venue for Eminem's character; B-Rabbit in a film titled 8 Mile), who goes into the house that Eminem is in. Eminem makes the chorus in the house in the next scene. The second verse starts in the forest, then it cuts to the detective at the house. He interrogates him through the second chorus and he seems to deny everything. The third verse starts with a black screen saying "3 AM", a reference to one of his songs of the same genre. Then he is taken back to the mental asylum, where he gets a needle shot into his arm. The video slowly fades.

Live performances
The song made its live debut at Eminem's Coachella performance on April 15, 2018. The song was placed on most setlists for the Revival Tour.

Reception
In a positive review, XXL called the song "eerie and awesome". In contrast, Consequence of Sound reacted negatively, stating, "his slow-motion yelling of the title aims for an unholy hybrid of Adam Sandler, Will Ferrell, and Pee-Wee Herman, and somehow still falls short."

Charts

Legacy
On his 2018 song "The Ringer" from his follow-up album Kamikaze, Eminem references the U.S. Secret Service visiting him in response to lyrics on Revival perceived to be threatening towards then-president Donald Trump. BuzzFeed filed a Freedom of Information Act request with the Secret Service to find out if this was true. In October 2019, the Secret Service revealed to BuzzFeed that, in response to an email from a TMZ employee pressing the agency to investigate Eminem for his "threatening lyrics" about Ivanka Trump on "Framed", they had conducted a background check and arranged an interview, in which the interviewers read the verse out loud to Eminem—and he rapped along. The agency subsequently decided against referring the case to a federal prosecutor.

References

2017 songs
Eminem songs
Songs written by Eminem
Songs written by Ken Hensley
Songs written by David Byron
Horrorcore songs
Songs written by Fredwreck
Song recordings produced by Fredwreck